The murder of Marcy Renee Conrad (February 5, 1967 – November 3, 1981) was perpetrated by Anthony Jacques Broussard, a 16-year-old high school student. Conrad's death gained national attention due to the age of her killer, forcing a re-evaluation of California statutes regarding juvenile sentencing for violent crimes. The case triggered widespread media coverage, as a stark example of social disaffection among suburban youth.

The murder of Marcy Renee Conrad, and subsequent events, were the inspiration for the screenplay of the Tim Hunter film River's Edge.

Murder
Marcy Renee Conrad, 14, was raped and killed  by 16-year-old Anthony Jacques Broussard in his home in Milpitas, California on November 3, 1981. Her body was transported in Broussard's pickup truck into nearby hills and dumped in a ravine. An autopsy confirmed that Conrad had been raped and then murdered by strangulation.

After the murder, Broussard invited friends from Milpitas High School to view Conrad's corpse. Reports indicate that Broussard bragged about her death at school, and showed the body to at least 10 people. After two days, two students finally broke ranks with the others and notified police. When the other Milpitas students were asked why they had not alerted police, they responded that they "did not want to get in trouble."

Broussard pleaded guilty and was sentenced to 25 years to life. He was denied a new trial in 1985, and has repeatedly been denied parole.  As of Jan 2022, Broussard is still incarcerated at California State Prison, Solano.

In culture
The murder partially inspired the screenplay for the 1986 film River's Edge.

The murder, and River’s Edge, are mentioned in John Darnielle’s 2022 novel, Devil House.

See also

List of kidnappings

References

Murdered American children
1967 births
1981 deaths
Deaths by person in California
Deaths by strangulation in the United States
Rapes in the United States
People murdered in California
C
1981 in California
1981 murders in the United States
Crime in the San Francisco Bay Area
Milpitas, California
History of the San Francisco Bay Area
November 1981 events in the United States
Female murder victims
Incidents of violence against girls